The Institute for Law and Finance (ILF) is a graduate school which was established as a non-profit foundation in 2002 by Goethe University Frankfurt am Main with the support of many prominent institutions. Leading commercial banks and international law firms, the Frankfurt Chamber of Commerce and Industry, the City of Frankfurt and the State of Hesse, as well as the European Central Bank and the Deutsche Bundesbank are actively involved in the ILF right from the planning stages until today. The ILF provides interdisciplinary training to lawyers, senior management and executives in Germany and worldwide and serves as a policy center in the legislative process by offering forums for discussions and exchanges between academia and practitioners.

The ILF offers the LL.M Finance and LL.M International Finance Degree Programs, Spring School on "Corporate Law in Practice" and Summer School on "Law of Banking and Capital Markets.

The Executive Director of the ILF is Andreas Cahn, Endowment Funds Commerzbank Professorship, Goethe University Frankfurt am Main. Theodor Baums, Professor of Civil, Corporate & Capital Markets Law, Goethe University Frankfurt and Manfred Wandt, Director, Institute for Insurance Law, Goethe University Frankfurt are ILF directors.

LL.M. Finance Program

The ILF at Goethe University in Frankfurt am Main offers a one-year postgraduate program leading to a LL.M. in Finance (LL.M. Finance) for graduate students with a bachelor's degree in law, business, or economics. German is not a requirement for admission since all courses are conducted in English. Goethe-University in Frankfurt am Main is one of Germany’s most prominent higher education institutions.

About 50 graduates will be admitted for study. The program is aimed at students with a prior degree in law or business/economics and who have an interest in combining theoretical knowledge with practical training in law and international finance. Previous professional experience is not a requirement, but would be an advantage. The emphasis is on international diversity, with over 20 different countries represented among the students. The program builds on the role of Frankfurt am Main as a leading banking, central banking and financial center of the European Union.

The curriculum is interdisciplinary covering all aspects of international financial law with emphasis on the EU and the US, along with parallel developments in the field of international finance. The students can choose from a list consisting of more than 35 courses such as Law of Corporate Finance, Capital Markets and Securities Law, Risk & Reward: The Business of Financial Intermediation, Financial Markets and Institutions, Law of Project and Acquisition Finance, Law of Investment Banking, Law of Commercial Banking, Nuts & Bolts of M&A, Principles of International and Business Taxation, Effective Negotiations, Insurance and Risk Management, Fundamentals of Finance, Accounting and International Accounting.

Since 2008, together with the Universities of Deusto, Tilburg, and Strasbourg, the ILF also offers the Erasmus Mundus „Master in Transnational Trade Law and Finance“, a Master’s program which has received the approval of the European Union.

ILF students are fully enrolled members of Goethe University Frankfurt am Main, which confers the LL.M. Finance and LL.M. International Finance degrees.

Internships

The LL.M. Finance program incorporates a special four to six weeks' internship with public and private institutions which support the ILF. These institutions typically include leading international law firms, banks, international accounting firms, the European Central Bank, Deutsche Bundesbank, BaFin and others. The ILF internship program offers a valuable opportunity to acquire relevant working experience and to create a network of professional contacts.

International Student Exchange Programs

The ILF maintains student exchange programs with Columbia Law School, FGV Direito Rio, and Amsterdam Business School.

LL.M. International Finance Program

In October 2014, a new LL.M. International Finance program for graduates holding a first degree in law, business or economics from Asia (especially mainland China, Hong Kong, Macau and Taiwan) was launched. The program offers interdisciplinary and practice-oriented training in the areas of international and European banking, securities and finance law to graduates from Asia.

Spring and Summer Schools

Every year, the ILF also offers 2-week summer and spring schools. The spring and summer schools are held in the German language.

Faculty

The ILF faculty consists of both academics as well as practitioners from Europe’s financial world, international law firms and the European Central Bank, the Deutsche Bundesbank (German Central Bank) and BaFin (German Financial Supervisory Authority).

Governing Boards

The governing boards of the ILF are the Executive Board, Board of Trustees, Academic Advisory Board and the Donors´Committee.

Executive Board

 Prof. Dr. Andreas Cahn, Endowment Funds Commerzbank Professorship, Executive Director of the ILF, Goethe University Frankfurt am Main
 Prof. Dr. Manfred Wandt, Director, Institute for Insurance Law, Goethe University Frankfurt am Main

Board of Trustees
 Mr. Antonio Sainz de Vicuna, former General Counsel, European Central Bank
 Mr. Hans Eichel, former Federal Minister of Finance
 Prof. Dr. Bernd Fahrholz, Honorary Senator, Goethe University Frankfurt am Main
 Prof. Dr. Thomas Gasteyer, Of Counsel, Clifford Chance
 Dr. Hendrik Haag, Partner, Hengeler Mueller (Chairman)
 Mr. Felix Hufeld, President, Bundesanstalt für Finanzdienstleistungsaufsicht (BaFin)
 Prof. Dr. Jan-P. Krahnen, Professor at the Department of Business & Economics, Goethe University Frankfurt am Main
 Mr. Hermann-Josef Lamberti, former Member of the Board of Managing Directors, Deutsche Bank
 Mr. Fausto Parente, Executive Director, European Insurance and Occupational Pensions Authority
 Dr. Thomas Schäfer, Minister of Finance, State of Hesse
 Prof. Dr. Rudolf Steinberg, former President, Goethe University Frankfurt am Main
 Mr. Carl-Ludwig Thiele, Member of the Executive Board Deutsche Bundesbank
 Mr. Karlheinz Weimar, former Minister of Finance, State of Hesse
 Prof. Dr. Birgitta Wolff, President, Goethe University, Frankfurt am Main
 Prof. Dr. Chiara Zilioli, General Counsel, European Central Bank

Academic Advisory Board
 Mr. Jean-Claude Trichet, former President of the European Central Bank (ECB) (Chairman)
 Professor Guido Ferrarini, Professor of Law, University of Genoa
 Professor Julian Franks, Professor of Finance, London Business School, Academic Director of London Business School’s Centre for Corporate Governance
 Professor Ronald Gilson, Professor of Law and Business, Columbia Law School and Stanford Law School
 Professor Karel van Hulle, Head of Unit Insurance and Pensions Financial Institutions, Internal Market Directorate-General, European Commission

Donors´ Committee
 Mr. Klaus-Albert Bauer, Partner, Freshfields Bruckhaus Deringer 
 Mr. Okko Behrends, Partner, DLA Piper UK LLP 
 Dr. Ulrike Binder, Partner, Mayer Brown
 Dr. Günther Bräunig, Member of the Board of Managing Directors, KfW Bankengruppe
 Dr. Alexander Georgieff, Partner, Georgieff Capital
 Ms. Ana-Christina Grohnert, Member of the Board of Managing Directors, Ernst & Young GmbH Wirtschaftsprüfungsgesellschaft
 Dr. Matthias Grund, Partner, K&L Gates LLP
 Mr. Rudolf Haas, Partner, Latham & Watkins LLP
 Dr. Mathias Hanten, Partner, DLA Piper UK LLP
 Mr. Oliver Hedtmann, Head of Corporate Legal, Deutsche Börse Group
 Mr. Thomas Heymann, Partner, Heymann & Partner
 Mr. Thorsten Höche, General Counsel, Bundesverband Deutscher Banken (The Association of German Banks)
 Mr. Jochen Hörbelt, General Counsel, BHF-Bank
 Dr. Esther Jansen, Partner, Shearman & Sterling
 Mr. Matthias Kasch, Partner, White & Case
 Dr. Helge Kortz, Partner, Gleiss Lutz
 Dr. Markus E. Krüger, Partner Latham & Watkins LLP
 Dr. Tobias Krug, Partner, Ashurst
 Dr. Olaf Langner, General Counsel, Deutscher Sparkassen-und Giroverband
 Dr. Manuel Lorenz, Partner, Baker & McKenzie
 Mr. Heinrich Meyer, Partner, Beiten Burkhardt Rechtsanwaltsgesellschaft mbH
 Dr. Markus Pfaff, Partner, CMS Hasche Sigle
 Prof. Dr. Stefan Reinhart, Partner, FPS Rechtsanwälte & Notare 
 Dr. Andreas Rodin, Partner, P+P Polläth + Partners
 Mr. Christian Rolf, Partner, Willkie Farr & Gallagher LLP
 Mr. Christoph Schauenberg, Partner, Luther Rechtsanwaltsgesellschaft mbH
 Dr. Manfred Schick, General Counsel, ING-DiBa AG
 Prof. Dr. Michael Schlitt, Partner, Hogan Lovells International LLP
 Dr. Dirk Schmalenbach, Partner, Freshfields Bruckhaus Deringer 
 Dr. Thomas Schürrle, Partner, Debevoise & Plimpton
 Mr. Andreas Steck, Partner, Linklaters
 Mr. Volker Steck, CEO, Helvetia Insurance
 Dr. Peter Stenz, Partner, Allen & Overy
 Dr. Jürgen van Kann, Partner, Fried Frank
 Dr. Laurenz Wieneke, Partner Noerr LLP

Location
The ILF is located in the House of Finance at Campus Westend of the Goethe-University Frankfurt am Main.

The House of Finance combines the university's interdisciplinary research on finance, monetary economics, and corporate and financial law under one roof.

The Departments of Finance and Money and Macroeconomics of the Faculty of Economics and Business Administration, and the Unit Law and Finance of the Faculty of Law contribute to the academic reputation of the House of Finance as do the other well-established institutions of the university – the Center for Financial Studies (CFS), the Institute for Law and Finance (ILF), the E-Finance Lab (EFL), the Institute for Monetary and Financial Stability (IMFS) and the Goethe Business School (GBS). The Frankfurt MathFinance Institute (FMFI) is attached to the Faculty of Computer Sciences and Mathematics and associated to the House of Finance through an outlet.

References 

Law schools in Germany
Bank regulation
Goethe University Frankfurt
University